Dominik Pacovsky (born June 8, 1990) is a Czech professional ice hockey player currently with BK Mladá Boleslav of the Czech Extraliga.  He previously played with HC Sparta Praha in the Czech Extraliga during the 2010–11 Czech Extraliga season, and HC Lev Praha in the Kontinental Hockey League. On May 19, 2014, he joined BK Mladá Boleslav on a two-year contract as a free agent.

References

External links

1990 births
Living people
Czech ice hockey forwards
HC Lev Praha players
HC Sparta Praha players
Ice hockey people from Prague
Kootenay Ice players
BK Mladá Boleslav players
HC Berounští Medvědi players
HC Slavia Praha players
Czech expatriate ice hockey players in Canada